May Aimée Smith (1886–1962) was an English painter and engraver.

Early life and education
Smith was born 16 March 1886 near Manchester, England. She studied wood engraving in Paris under Dmitri Galanis.

Career
She had shows with the Society of Wood Engravers and at the Salon d'Automne in Paris. In 1949 she was included in the Seventh Annual Exhibition of Lithograpy and Wood Engraving at the Art Institute of Chicago.

Her work is included in the collections of the Seattle Art Museum, the Auckland City Art Gallery, the Nottingham City Museums and Galleries, the Museum of New Zealand Te Papa Tongarewa and the Victoria & Albert Museum, London

Smith died in 1962 at Birch Vale, Stockport, Cheshire, England.

References

1886 births
1962 deaths
20th-century English women artists
20th-century English painters